Ross Collins (born 9 December 1945) is an Australian cricketer. He played twenty-three first-class and six List A matches for New South Wales between 1967/68 and 1975/76.

See also
 List of New South Wales representative cricketers

References

External links
 

1945 births
Living people
Australian cricketers
New South Wales cricketers
Cricketers from Sydney